Jared Nathan (August 10, 1985 – December 28, 2006) was an American actor from Nashua, New Hampshire, United States. He starred in the first season of the revival of the PBS Kids television show Zoom. He left the show after Season 1 ended.

Biography

Early life
Nathan was the only child of Dr. Jeffrey Nathan and June Woods Nathan. Raised in Nashua, New Hampshire, he began performing on stage as a child with local groups such as Junior Actorsingers and the Peacock Players. He appeared in a Papa Gino's commercial at age 12.

Zoom (1999)
Nathan was a star of the first season of the newer version of Zoom on PBS. He co-starred with Zoe Costello and Alisa Besher. He eventually became too old for Zoom and was replaced by Caroline Botelho.

Education
Nathan attended Bishop Guertin High School in Nashua for two years before switching to the arts-oriented Walnut Hill School in Natick, Massachusetts. After graduating from Walnut Hill in 2004, he studied drama at the Juilliard School and was a third-year student on winter break at the time of his death.

Death and aftermath
Nathan died from injuries in a car crash on December 28, 2006, when the car in which he was a passenger hit a tree broadside in Hollis, New Hampshire. He was taken to St. Joseph's Hospital in Nashua where he was pronounced dead. He was 21 years old. An episode of Jeopardy! was dedicated to his memory.

Hudson, Massachusetts native Gabriel King, a best friend of the actor, was driving when the accident occurred. King was sentenced to a year in confinement after pleading guilty to negligent homicide because of speeding. Half of the jail term was suspended after the judge said that King was a remarkable young man and good person who caused death by reckless behavior.

The Jared Nathan Scholarship for the Arts
In the summer of 2007, less than one year after Jared's death, friends and alumni of Peacock Players decided to put on a production of the comedy show, "The Bible: The Complete Works of God (Abridged)", with all proceeds going to a scholarship in Jared's name. They called it "The Jared Nathan Scholarship For The Arts". This scholarship was given to students who were graduating, attending Peacock Players summer program, or a part of a Peacock Players mainstage production.

In 2009, Peacock Players alumni who were all close friends with Jared, re-created and brought back a revival version of the show "Songs For A New World", composed by Jason Robert Brown, which they had originally performed in the summer of 2006, the same summer Jared starred in Peacock Players alumni show "The Wild Party". The 2010 revival of the show was in Jared's name, and all proceeds went to The Jared Nathan Scholarship for the Arts. This scholarship is given to a student at Peacock Players who is talented, outgoing and artistic in many different ways. It is awarded to at least one graduating senior for college tuition expenses.

References

External links

Remembering Jared Nathan: The Gift of a Happy Heart

1985 births
2006 deaths
American male child actors
American male television actors
Juilliard School alumni
Male actors from New Hampshire
People from Nashua, New Hampshire
Road incident deaths in New Hampshire
20th-century American male actors
Bishop Guertin High School alumni